Abderrahmane Derouaz (born 12 December 1955) is a retired Algerian international footballer. He represented Algeria in the 1980 Summer Olympics.

References

External links
Abderrahmane Derouaz FIFA Record at fifa.com

1955 births
Living people
Footballers from Algiers
Algerian footballers
Algeria international footballers
Olympic footballers of Algeria
Footballers at the 1980 Summer Olympics
USM Alger players
1980 African Cup of Nations players
Association football defenders
21st-century Algerian people
20th-century Algerian people